Männer haben kein Gehirn (Men don't have Brains) is a promotional audiobook by German rock band Die Ärzte. It is a sampler of the 2001 "Lese-Tour" (reading tour) "Die Ärzte – Hören, sehen, sagen... nicht! – Die Lesetour" featuring Markus Karg, the author of the official biography "Ein überdimensionales Meerschwein frisst die Erde auf". The original promo CD was only released for official fan club members, however, the audio files can still be downloaded from the band's official website.

Track listing 
 Nackig vorm Fahrstuhl [Nude in Front of the Elevator] - 4:00
 Der wunderbare Brunftschrei des FU [The Wonderful Rutting Call of Farin Urlaub] - 3:01
 Who Are Those Guys? - 2:44
 Rockstar und Groupie [Rock Star and Groupie] - 2:50
 Dicke fette Votze [Big Fat Cunt] - 2:46
 Die breite Masse [The Big Masses] - 2:49
 Pausenmusik [Musical Interlude] - 2:51
 Famous Last Words - 2:49
 The Asshole of the Year - 2:59
 Monsterparty - 2:53
 Elektrobier (unplugged) [Electro Beer] - 3:06
 Pelzbesetzte Rührschüsseln [Fur-trimmed Mixing Bowls] - 2:47
 Der Werschwanz [The Were-Dick] - 3:01
 Bela, du nervst! [ Bela B., you bug us!] - 2:53
 Heil Sahnie! [Hail Sahnie!] - 2:55
 Stulle mit Jagdwurst [Sandwich with Jagdwurst] - 2:50
 Heroin für Katzen [Heroin for Cats] - 3:10
 Die Nacht von Basel [The Night of Basel]- 3:11
 Mehr sexy [More sexy]- 2:28
 Ein Spaziergang in Farin Urlaub [A Walk in Farin Urlaub]- 2:55
 Pinkelpause [Pee break] - 3:04
 Die schwanzgeile Großmutter [The cock hungry Grandmother] - 3:36
 Lila Teppiche gegen Gewalt [Purple carpets against Violence]- 3:52
 Der Scheidenmagnetismus a.k.a. Angriff der Fett-Teenager [The Vagina Magnetism a.k.a. Attack of the Fat-teens] - 3:45

Die Ärzte – Hören, sehen, sagen... nicht! – Die Lesetour 
The Die Ärzte – Hören, sehen, sagen... nicht! – Die Lesetour (Die Ärzte - Hear, see, say... not! - The Reading Tour) is the 13th concert tour by German rock band Die Ärzte. Members Farin Urlaub, Bela B. and Rodrigo González as well as Markus Karg, the author, read out the band's official biography titled "Ein überdimensionales Meerschwein frisst die Erde auf" ["An oversized guinea pig eats the Earth"].

Tour dates

See also 
 Jenseits der Grenze des Zumutbaren (2003)
 Jazzfäst (2008)

External links
 Free download on the band's website

Die Ärzte albums
2001 albums